The Caleb Technology UHD144 (Ultra High Density) is a floptical-based 144 MB floppy disk system introduced in early 1998, marketed as the it drive. Like other floptical-like systems, the UHD144 can read and write standard 720 KB and 1.44 MB 3½-inch disks as well. Its main advantage was the low cost of the media, which averaged about $5 shortly after introduction — in wider production prices would have fallen.

The UHD144 had little chance in the marketplace, being squeezed out by the Iomega ZIP and Imation LS-120 for floppy large-storage needs, and the rapid introduction of the writable CD-ROM shortly after its introduction. The company went bankrupt in early 2002.

See also
 SuperDisk
 Sony HiFD
 Zip drive
 Floppy disk

References
 Caleb Technology Corp.'s Ultra High Density Floppy Disk Drive to Include Adaptec's DMC Chipset, Business Wire, 1997-11-03
 Two new reasons to kiss your floppy drive goodbye, PCWORLD.COM, 1998-10-13
 SuperFloppies! Floppy Disk Size, Hard Disk Capacity, Glencoe, 1998-10-31
 The Latest Trumors, HAL-PC Magazine, Beverly Rosenbaum, 1999-12-03

Floppy disk drives